This is a list of television channels broadcasting regularly programmes in Russian language.

State-owned

TV channels

General original movies and shows

State-funded

Private

Russia

Other countries

See also
Lists of television channels

References

Lists of television channels by language